All except one (New York) are free and deal with a state of the United States.

See also
 List of online encyclopedias

 
 
 
Online state encyclopedias
Online state encyclopedias
Online state encyclopedias
Wikipedia resources for researchers